Khammouan United Football Club (Laos ສະໂມສອນຄໍາມ່ວນຢູໄນເຕັດ) is a Laos professional football club based in Khammouane, Laos. They play in the top national football league in Laos, and finished ninth in the Lao Premier League Their home stadium is Khammouan Stadium.

External links

Football clubs in Laos
Association football clubs established in 2016